is a railway station located in the town of Funagata, Yamagata Prefecture, Japan,  operated by the East Japan Railway Company (JR East).

Lines
Funagata Station is served by the Ōu Main Line, and is located 140.3 rail kilometers from the terminus of the line at Fukushima Station.

Station layout
The station has two opposed side platforms connected by a footbridge. The station is attended, and the station building is also the town's Tourism and Local Products Promotion Center.

Platforms

History
Funagata Station opened on July 21, 1902. The station was absorbed into the JR East network upon the privatization of the JNR on April 1, 1987. A new station building was completed in March 1993.

Passenger statistics
In fiscal 2018, the station was used by an average of 86 passengers daily (boarding passengers only).

Surrounding area
Funagata Town Hall
 
Funagata Post Office

See also
List of railway stations in Japan

References

External links

 JR East Station information 

Railway stations in Yamagata Prefecture
Rikuu East Line
Railway stations in Japan opened in 1902
Funagata, Yamagata